The Branlebas class  was a class of ten destroyers built for the French Navy in the first decade of the 20th century. Eight of the ships survived the First World War and were scrapped afterwards.

Construction and design
Like all the 300-tonne destroyers, the Branlebas-class ships had a turtledeck forecastle with a flying deck, raised above the hull, aft.

A  belt of armour was fitted to protect the ship's boilers and machinery. The class was built with the standard gun armament for the 300-tonne destroyers, with a single  forward, backed up by six  guns, while two 450 mm (17.7 in) torpedo tubes were carried, with one amidships and one right aft. The ships had a complement of 4 officers and 56 men.

The Branlebas class were considered good sea-boats, with reliable machinery. (French destroyer size had been kept small owing to the influence of the Jeune École, which favoured the construction of large numbers of small ships.)

Losses 

Branlebas was sunk by a German mine on 30 September 1915 near Nieuwpoort, Belgium.
Étendard was sunk by German torpedoboat A39 on 25 April 1917 in the North Sea.

Ships

Notes

Citations

Bibliography

 

 
Destroyer classes
Destroyers of the French Navy
 
Ship classes of the French Navy